Bluebell, Bluebells, or Bluebelle may refer to:

Plants
 genus Hyacinthoides
 Common bluebell (H. non-scripta)
 Spanish bluebell (H. hispanica)
 Italian bluebell (H. italica)
 genus Muscari (perhaps more commonly known as grape hyacinth)
 genus Mertensia
 Virginia bluebell (Mertensia virginica)
 Scottish bluebell (harebell) (Campanula rotundifolia)
 Australian royal bluebell (Wahlenbergia gloriosa)
 Texas bluebell (Eustoma russellianum)
 Desert or California bluebell (Phacelia campanularia)

Places

Ireland
 Bluebell, Dublin, a suburb of Dublin, Ireland

United Kingdom
 Bluebell Lakes, five fishing lakes near Peterborough, England
 Blue Bell Hill, a hill between Rochester and Maidstone, Kent, England

United States
 Bluebell, Utah, United States, a census-designated place
 Bluebell Creek, United States, a tributary of the Yukon River in Alaska
 Bluebell Creek (Iowa), United States, a minor tributary of the Upper Mississippi River
 Bluebell Knoll, another name for Boulder Mountain (Utah)

Entertainment
 Bluebell Records, an Italian independent record label active from 1959 to 1969
 The Bluebells, a 1980s Scottish indie new wave band
 The Bluebells (EP), released in 1983
 The Bluebells, an earlier name of Labelle, an American all-female singing group of the 1960s and '70s
 "Bluebells" (song), a song by Patrick Wolf
 "The Bluebell", a song by Patrick Wolf from The Magic Position
 Bluebell (TV series), a British television drama series in 1986
 Bluebell, a fictional rabbit in the novel Watership Down
 Bluebell, a fictional troll from the miniseries The 10th Kingdom
 Bluebell, a fictional town that is the setting for the TV show Hart of Dixie
 "Bluebells", an episode of the television series Teletubbies
 Margaret Kelly (dancer) (1910–2004), nicknamed "Miss Bluebell", Irish dancer and founder of the Bluebell Girls

Ships
 , two Royal Navy ships
 , a United States Coast Guard inland buoy tender
 Bluebelle (ship), a yacht that was the site of a multiple murder in 1961
 Bluebell (1906 ship), a ferry operated in Toronto from 1906 to 1955
 Bluebell, a harbour ferry involved in the Bluebell Collision in Newcastle, Australia

Sports
 Bluebell United F.C., an Irish association football club originally based in Bluebell, Dublin
 Bluebelles, nickname of West Wallsend FC, a senior soccer club in New South Wales, Australia
 Dundonald Bluebell F.C., a Scottish football club based in Cardenden, Fife
 The Bluebell Stadium, a football stadium in Lisburn, County Antrim, Northern Ireland
 Bluebell Stakes, a Listed flat horse race in Ireland

Other uses
 Bluebell Railway, a heritage line running along the border between East and West Sussex, England
 SECR P Class 323 Bluebell, a locomotive
 Bluebell Arboretum, near Smisby, South Derbyshire, England
 Bluebell Mine, Riondel, British Columbia, Canada

See also
 Blue Bell (disambiguation)